Imelda Chiappa (born 10 May 1966) is a retired female racing cyclist from Italy. She represented her native country at two Summer Olympics: 1988 and 1996. Her most significant achievement was winning the silver medal in the women's individual road race at the 1996 Summer Olympics in Atlanta, Georgia.

References

External links

1966 births
Living people
People from Sotto il Monte Giovanni XXIII
Italian female cyclists
Cyclists at the 1988 Summer Olympics
Cyclists at the 1996 Summer Olympics
Olympic cyclists of Italy
Olympic silver medalists for Italy
Olympic medalists in cycling
Medalists at the 1996 Summer Olympics
Cyclists from the Province of Bergamo
20th-century Italian women
21st-century Italian women